John Shanahan may refer to:
 John Shanahan (swimmer), New Zealand swimmer
 John W. Shanahan, American Roman Catholic bishop
 John N.T. Shanahan, United States Air Force general